Just Add Life is a 1996 album by Scottish rock band The Almighty; it was the band's fifth studio album and the last released until 2000's self-titled album during which time the band split up. Two singles, "All Sussed Out" and "Do You Understand" were released from the album in multiple parts in the United Kingdom and both were made into music videos. The song "Coalition Star" was co-written with members of punk band The Ruts, of which Warwick was a fan. The album was also issued as a two disc set including the bonus studio track "Misery Guts" and a 17-track live disc known as Just Add Live.

Track listing 
All songs written by Ricky Warwick except as indicated:
"Ongoing & Total" – 4:16
"Do You Understand" – 3:16
"All Sussed Out" (Ricky Warwick, Pete Friesen) – 3:17
"How Real is Real for You" – 2:33
"Dead Happy" – 3:16
"Some Kind of Anything" – 2:26
Floyd London on lead vocals
"Coalition Star" (Warwick, Paul Fox, Dave Ruffy, John "Segs" Jennings) – 4:42
"8 Day Depression" – 3:05
"Look What Happened Tomorrow" – 3:07
"360" – 3:27
"Feed the Need" – 3:32
"Afraid of Flying" – 0:43
"Independent Deterrent" (Warwick, Friesen) -3:28

B-Sides 
 "Misery Guts" – 3:12
 "Superpower" – 3:16
 "DSS (Desperately Seeking Something)" – 2:03
 "Tense Nervous Headshake" – 1:42
 "Canned Jesus" (Friesen) – 3:09
 "Everybody's Burning"
 "I Fought the Law (Live)" – 3:18
 "Do You Understand (I.L.R. Radio Session)" – 3:18

Personnel 
As listed in liner notes.

The Almighty
Ricky Warwick – vocals, guitars
Pete Friesen – guitars
Floyd London – bass, vocals
Stump Munroe – drums

Additional musicians
Mark Feltham – harmonica on "Independent Deterrent"
James Taylor – Hammond B3 organ on "8 Day Depression" and "Feed the Need"

 'Kick Horns' on "All Sussed Out" 
Simon Clarke – baritone and alto saxophone
Roddy Lorimer – trumpet
Tim Sanders – tenor saxophone

Production 
Pom & Phil Luff – assistant engineers, Ridge Farm Studio, Rusper
John Rodd – assistant engineer, Great Linford Manor
Chris Sheldon – producer
Mark Warner – mixer and assistant engineer, The Townhouse

Mastered by Andy Van Dett at Masterdisk, New York

References 

1996 albums
The Almighty (band) albums
Albums produced by Chris Sheldon
Chrysalis Records albums